Northaven is an unincorporated community located in north Shelby County, Tennessee, United States, that is a part of the Memphis metropolitan area. Tennessee State Route 388 connects Northaven with Frayser and Shelby Forest. The Mississippi River Trail runs through the neighborhood.

Geography
Northaven boundaries are the Mississippi River in the west, Millington and Memphis in the north, Raleigh in the east, the Wolf River and Frayser in the south.

Education 
Northaven Elementary School, which is part of the Shelby County School System serves the community.

Notable people 
 Antonio D. James

References

Unincorporated communities in Tennessee

Unincorporated communities in Shelby County, Tennessee
Geography of Memphis, Tennessee